Chen Yi (August 26, 1901 – January 6, 1972) was a Chinese communist military commander and politician. He served as Mayor of Shanghai from 1949 to 1958 and as Foreign Minister of China from 1958 to 1972.

Early life
Chen was born in Lezhi County near Chengdu, Sichuan, into a moderately wealthy magistrate's family.

War
A comrade of Lin Biao from their guerrilla days, he was prominent in the Jiangxi Soviet. Later, due to a leg injury, he was the only one of the later Ten Marshals to have not participated in the Long March. Thus, Chen was later made a commander under Ye Ting in the New Fourth Army. After the Wannan Incident, Chen succeeded Ye Ting as commander of the New Fourth Army during the Sino-Japanese War (1937-1945). He played a pivotal role as commander of the 3rd Field Army working closely with his close friend and comrade Su Yu. When Su Yu showed his expertise and talent in large formational warfare, the division of labour between them meant that Chen Yi remained in command of 3rd Field Army, but mainly focused on rallying support for Su Yu's plans as well as focusing on political work, which was his area of expertise. Thus, he and Su Yu spearheaded the Shandong counter-offensive during the Chinese Civil War, and later commanded the Communist armies that defeated the KMT forces during the Huaihai Campaign and conquered the lower Yangtze region in 1948–49. After the capture of Shanghai, he remained in Shanghai as Mayor where he oversaw the economic stabilisation and reconstruction. In 1950, he offered to take command of the People's Volunteer Army in Korea, but Mao declined, possibly because Chen's partner Su Yu was in poor health due to shrapnel injury and selected Peng Dehuai instead. He was made a Marshal of the People's Liberation Army (PLA) in 1955.

People's Republic
After the founding of the People's Republic of China, Chen became mayor of Shanghai. He also served as vice premier from 1954 to 1972 and foreign minister from 1958 to 1972 and president of the China Foreign Affairs University from 1961 to 1969. As vice premier, he was present during the breakup of Sino-Soviet relations. In August 1960, Chen Yi attempted to ease tensions with the Soviets, declaring on one instance to the Soviet Ambassador to Beijing that Moscow should stop "severing the friendship between the two nations," and two weeks later to the Soviet deputy foreign minister that Moscow and Beijing should both try to save the alliance. During the Cultural Revolution, he was criticized in 1967, but never dismissed, so Zhou Enlai performed the duties of foreign minister in his place. He was a member of the 8th CPC Politburo from 1956 to 1967 but was not admitted to the 9th Politburo (1969), though he was a member of the 9th CPC Central Committee.

After Marshal Lin Biao's death in 1971, he was restored to favour, although not to his former power. Mao Zedong attended Chen's funeral in 1972. This was Mao's last public appearance and his first appearance at anyone's funeral during the Cultural Revolution.

See also

 List of officers of the People's Liberation Army
 Historical Museum of French-Chinese Friendship

References

External links 

Long March Leaders: Chen Yi (by Paul Noll)
陈毅纪念馆 (Chen Yi memorial site)
诗人元帅——陈毅 (The poet-general Chen Yi)
Handbook for the Chinese Civil War (US Naval War College)

|-

|-

|-

|-

Foreign Ministers of the People's Republic of China
Marshals of the People's Republic of China
Mayors of Shanghai
1901 births
1972 deaths
New Fourth Army generals
Chinese Communist Party politicians from Sichuan
Politicians from Ziyang
People of the Chinese Civil War
People's Republic of China politicians from Sichuan
Chinese expatriates in France
20th-century Chinese politicians
Members of the 8th Politburo of the Chinese Communist Party
Secretaries of the Communist Party Shanghai Committee
Vice Chairpersons of the National Committee of the Chinese People's Political Consultative Conference
Burials at Babaoshan Revolutionary Cemetery